Kratušín is a municipality and village in Prachatice District in the South Bohemian Region of the Czech Republic. It has about 50 inhabitants.

Administrative parts
The village of Chlístov is an administrative part of Kratušín.

References

Villages in Prachatice District